George Low (1847–1912) was a United States Navy sailor and a recipient of the United States military's highest decoration, the Medal of Honor. His birth name was George Low Evatt.

Biography
Born in 1847 in Canada, Low immigrated to the United States and joined the Navy from New York. On that day, while Tennessee was at New Orleans, Louisiana, Gunner's Mate N.P. Petersen fell overboard. Low jumped into the water and kept the man afloat until they were both picked up by a boat. For this action, he was awarded the Medal of Honor three and a half years later, on October 18, 1884.

Low's official Medal of Honor citation reads:
For jumping overboard from the U.S.S. Tennessee at New Orleans, La., 15 February 1881, and sustaining, until picked up by a boat's crew, N. P. Petersen, gunner's mate, who had fallen overboard.

See also

List of Medal of Honor recipients during peacetime

References

External links

1847 births
1912 deaths
Canadian emigrants to the United States
United States Navy sailors
United States Navy Medal of Honor recipients
Canadian-born Medal of Honor recipients
Non-combat recipients of the Medal of Honor